, released as Super Bust-A-Move 2 in North America and Europe, is a puzzle video game in the Puzzle Bobble series developed by Taito, and was released in 2002 for the PlayStation 2.

Gameplay
Super Puzzle Bobble 2 incorporates pretty much the same elements as the previous games. The gameplay has its own story mode, endless puzzle mode, battle mode, two player competitive battle mode and lastly an edit mode, which allows players to create their own customized rounds.

Modes
There are more several modes more than the original games, including:

 Story Mode
 Puzzle Mode
 CPU Battle
 2 Player Battle
 Edit Mode

Reception

The game received above-average reviews according to the review aggregation website Metacritic. In Japan, Famitsu gave it a score of 26 out of 40.

Ryan Davis of GameSpot said the game had bad presentation, video clips and voices and was not worth the attention of anyone but those who were really into Bust-a-Move, but the gameplay was just as fun and challenging. Jeremy Dunham of IGN gave credit to the developer, pleased that the gameplay remained the same and faithful to its predecessors.

References

External links

2002 video games
PlayStation 2 games
PlayStation 2-only games
Puzzle video games
Taito games
Ubisoft games
Bubble Bobble
Video games developed in Japan